Gregory Downs (born 13 December 1958) is an English former professional footballer. Originally a centre-forward, he switched to left full-back early in his career.

Downs began his career with Norwich City where he was player of the year in 1982, the year they won promotion to the First Division a year after relegation.

He remained at Carrow Road until 1985, when moved to Coventry City where he won an FA Cup winner's medal in the 1987 final, where they achieved a surprise 3–2 win over Tottenham Hotspur. He spent five years at Highfield Road, playing 146 league games and scoring four goals.

On leaving in 1990, he dropped down to the Third Division to sign for Birmingham City, playing 17 times in the disappointing 1990–91 campaign where the Blues recorded their lowest ever finish of 13th place. He was then signed by Hereford United, who had appointed former Coventry boss John Sillett as manager for the 1991–92 season. Sillett left Edgar Street after one disappointing season in charge, and Downs was appointed player-manager in his place, an arrangement which lasted for two seasons until he was succeeded by John Layton. In three seasons at the Bulls, he played 108 times in the league's basement division, scoring twice.

After retiring from professional football in 1995, Downs joined the police. However, he continued playing non-league football into his mid forties.

In 2006, he joined Wroxham as assistant to player-manager Damian Hilton. The pair resigned in November 2007; though Hilton had second thoughts and was re-appointed manager, Downs left the club.

References

External links
Career information at ex-canaries.co.uk

1958 births
Living people
English footballers
English football managers
Malvern Town F.C. players
Norwich City F.C. players
Coventry City F.C. players
Birmingham City F.C. players
Hereford United F.C. players
Raunds Town F.C. players
Kettering Town F.C. players
Redditch United F.C. players
Merthyr Tydfil F.C. players
Worcester City F.C. players
Forest Green Rovers F.C. players
Bridgnorth Town F.C. players
Dereham Town F.C. players
North American Soccer League (1968–1984) players
Connecticut Bicentennials players
Great Yarmouth Town F.C. players
British police officers
Hereford United F.C. managers
People from Carlton, Nottinghamshire
Footballers from Nottinghamshire
Association football defenders
English expatriate sportspeople in the United States
Expatriate soccer players in the United States
English expatriate footballers
FA Cup Final players